The City of Salisbury is a local government area (LGA) located on the northern fringes of Adelaide, South Australia. It had population of 137,979 people in 2016 and encompasses an area of 158 km². The council's main offices are situated in the Salisbury central business district. Geographically, the region is located on the outskirts of Adelaide. In recent years the council has become a leader in water management and the use of recycled water.

History
The Kaurna people were the first to be associated with the Salisbury area.

The township of Salisbury (after Salisbury in Wiltshire) was established by John Harvey, who had migrated from Scotland in 1839. Harvey purchased land beside the Little Para River in 1847 and, in 1848, sold allotments for the town. By 1881 the population of the town was close to 500.

The District Council of Salisbury was formed on 22 June 1933 by an amalgamation of parts of the abolished District Council of Munno Para West and the District Council of Yatala North. The population of the township upon incorporation was 2,385, but almost doubled from 1940 when the federal government built a munitions factory at Penfield, reaching 4,160 by 1947.

The town council was briefly renamed the District Council of Salisbury and Elizabeth on 22 August 1963, but reverted to its former name after the Elizabeth area was severed to form the new Town of Elizabeth on 13 February 1964. 

The Salisbury council was granted city status on 6 July 1964, becoming the City of Salisbury.

Culture and events
The City of Salisbury holds many events and celebrates culture and diversity.

The City of Salisbury, the Writers SA and the Salisbury Library Service have co-hosted the Salisbury Writers' Festival since 2005.

The City of Salisbury has a “sister city” relationship with Mobara in Japan. Mobara Park in Mawson Lakes was named in honour.

Services
Local Councils in South Australia, including the City of Salisbury, are established and empowered by the State Government under the Local Government Act 1999.

The Council of the City of Salisbury is made up of Elected Members (the Council) and administrative staff who make decisions and undertake works and deliver services on behalf of the Salisbury community. The Council, consisting of the Mayor and Ward Councillors, is the decision-making body for the government and management of the City of Salisbury.

The Mayor and Councillors represent the interests of the community and ultimately are responsible for the workings of the Council, allocation of the budget and the services it delivers. Elected Members vote on what action will be taken with regard to issues brought before the Council.

Elected Members can be contacted to discuss any matter relating to Council.

Elected Members are volunteers who want to be involved in making the City a better place in which to live, work and do business. As volunteers, Elected Members receive an allowance determined by the independent South Australian Remuneration Tribunal for expenses incurred and time spent in the discharge of their duties, often making difficult decisions about complex and important matters.

Elected Members are assisted by the administration that works under the direction of the Chief Executive Officer. Council staff provide advice, implement the decisions of Council, and perform the daily works necessary to keep the Council operating.

The Council 2022 - 2026

The Mayor and Councillors elected in November 2022 were:

Chairman and Mayors of Salisbury
 Henry John Wynter Griffiths (1933–1934) <ref D.C.Records>
 Harold Lockheart Martin (1934–1935)
 Arnold Godfrey Jenkins (1935–1939)
 Harold Lockheart Martin (1939–1942)
 Andrew Thomas Goodall (1942–1953)
 Leslie Paul McIntyre (1953–1955)
 Keith Neil Davis (1955–1957)
 Harry Lyle Bowey (1957–1961)
 Stewart Lynn Gilchrist (1961)
 John Lawrence Lindblom (1962–1965)
 Harry Lyle Bowey (1965–1978)
 Ronald Thomas White (1978–1983)
 David Allen Plumridge (1983–1987)
 Patricia St Clair-Dixon (1987–1993)
 David Allen Plumridge (1993–1997)
 Tony Zappia (1997–2007)
 Gillian Aldridge (2008–current)

See also
 Local Government Areas of South Australia
 List of Adelaide suburbs
 List of Adelaide parks and gardens

References

External links

City of Salisbury Facebook page
City of Salisbury on Twitter
City of Salisbury community profile
City of Salisbury Asset Management Information

Local government areas in Adelaide
Local government areas of South Australia